"Mere Desh Ki Dharti" is an Indian Hindi song from the Bollywood film Upkar (1967). The lyrics of the song were written by Gulshan Kumar Mehta, and the music was composed by Kalyanji–Anandji. Mahendra Kapoor was the playback singer. This is a patriotic song, and was picturised on Manoj Kumar in the film. The song earned Kumar the nickname Mr. Bharat.

Theme 
The song glorifies the land of India, the lyricist's motherland. He says the land of his country grows gold, diamond, and pearl. Here he compares the crops grown by the farmers of the country as these expensive gems.

Awards and reception 
This is an all-time popular Hindi patriotic song. In 1968 Gulshan Kumar Mehta received a Filmfare Award for Best Lyricist for this song. Mahendra Kapoor, the male playback singer, won a President's silver medal.

References

External links 
 

Lyrics of this song

Indian songs
Hindi-language songs
1967 songs
Hindi film songs
Indian patriotic songs